Pignon may refer to:

People

Surnames
 Ernest Pignon-Ernest, French artist

Places
Pignon, a commune in Haiti